Lugduff at , is the 154th–highest peak in Ireland on the Arderin scale, and the 186th–highest peak on the Vandeleur-Lynam scale.  Lugduff is situated in the southern sector of the Wicklow Mountains range, and forms a broad horseshoe around the Upper Lake of the Glendalough valley with the mountains of Mullacor , Conavalla , the hydroelectric station at Turlough Hill , and Camaderry . 

Lugduff's steep western slopes, have a distinctive "corrugated" profile, and form the deep valley sidewall of the eastern flank of Glenmalure; Lugduff's western walls also sit at the T-junction of the Fraughan Rock Glen hanging valley with the Glenmalure valley.  

Just below Lugduff's summit, lies the popular 8-kilometre boarded mountain path of The Spinc White Trail around the Upper Lake of Glendalough.  To the south of Lugduff is the subsidiary summit of Lugduff SE Top .

Bibliography

Gallery

See also

Wicklow Way
Wicklow Mountains
Lists of mountains in Ireland
List of mountains of the British Isles by height
List of Hewitt mountains in England, Wales and Ireland

References

External links
MountainViews: The Irish Mountain Website, Lugduff
MountainViews: Irish Online Mountain Database
The Database of British and Irish Hills , the largest database of British Isles mountains ("DoBIH")
Hill Bagging UK & Ireland, the searchable interface for the DoBIH

Mountains and hills of County Wicklow
Hewitts of Ireland
Mountains under 1000 metres